Gennadius was an East Roman (Byzantine) general and the first exarch of Africa.

Biography
He held this post until named exarch by Emperor Maurice sometime between 585 and 592. Already a patricius by 582, he was awarded the title of honorary consul sometime before 585. As exarch, he had an extensive correspondence with Pope Gregory the Great on issues of the African Church, and especially the suppression of the Donatists. He was succeeded by Innocentius as a civilian praetorian prefect of Africa.

References

Sources

6th-century births
6th-century Byzantine people
7th-century deaths
Byzantine generals
Exarchs of Africa
Gennadius (Africae)
Patricii